The 22nd Assembly District of Wisconsin is one of 99 districts in the Wisconsin State Assembly. Located in southeastern Wisconsin, the district comprises the village of Butler, part of the village of Menomonee Falls, various municipalities in northeast Waukesha County and southwest Washington County, and a few blocks of northwestern Milwaukee.  The district is represented by Republican Janel Brandtjen, since January 2015.

The 22nd Assembly district is located within Wisconsin's 8th Senate district, along with the 23rd and 24th Assembly districts.

List of past representatives

References 

Wisconsin State Assembly districts
Milwaukee County, Wisconsin
Waukesha County, Wisconsin
Washington County, Wisconsin